Donatella is an Italian feminine given name meaning "gift" or "gift of God".

People
 Donatella Agostinelli (born 1974),  Italian politician
 Donatella Arpaia (born 1971), American restaurateur and television chef
 Donatella Finocchiaro (born 1970), Italian actress
 Donatella Flick, former wife of Gert Rudolph Flick
 Donatella della Porta (born 1956), Italian political scientist
 Donatella Rettore (born 1955), Italian singer and songwriter
 Donatella Versace (born 1955), Italian fashion designer

Entertainment
 Donatella Flick Conducting Competition, an international music competition for young conductors
 Donatella (film), a 1956 Italian comedy film directed by Mario Monicelli
 "Donatella", a 2013 song by Lady Gaga from Artpop

Italian feminine given names